Henry Lee McFee (April 14, 1886 – March 19, 1953) was a pioneer American cubist painter and a prominent member of the Woodstock artists colony.

Biography
McFee was born in St. Louis, Missouri in 1886.  From 1902 to 1905, he attended Kemper Military School in Boonville, Missouri. In 1907, he inherited a large sum of money, allowing him to enroll in the Stevenson Art School and pursue painting full-time.  He was heavily influenced by the two summers he spent attending classes at the Art Students League in Woodstock, New York, studying under L. Birge Harrison. In November 1913, McFee exhibited six works at the MacDowell Club.  In 1919, McFee was one of the founders of the Woodstock Artists’ Association, along with Andrew Dasburg, Carl Eric Lindin, John Carlson, and Frank Swift Chase.  In 1920, his work was shown at the Gallerie Georges Petit's International Art Exhibition in Paris. McFee's first one-man show was in 1927 at the Rehn Galler.

In 1939 McFee was appointed Director at the Witte Museum School of Art, which was sponsored by the San Antonio Art League.  He was awarded a Guggenheim Fellowship in 1940, and in 1940-1941 he held positions at Claremont Graduate School and the Chouinard Art Institute in Los Angeles, California. He works closely with fellow Los Angeles artist and teacher Bentley Schaad.

McFee was married to Aileen Fletcher Jones from 1916 to 1936, when he eloped with her niece, Eleanor Brown Gutsell.  McFee's synchromist and cubist influenced works were exhibited at many notable venues throughout his career, including the Carnegie Institute, the Pennsylvania Academy, the Corcoran Gallery, the Museum of Modern Art, and the Whitney Museum. McFee died in 1953 of pneumonia at St. Luke Hospital in Pasadena, California.

References

Further reading
 Henry Lee McFee and Formalist Realism in American Still Life. 1923-1936. By John Baker. Center Gallery. Lewisburg. 1987.
 Henry Lee McFee (American Artists Series). By Virgil Barker. Whitney Museum of American Art, New York. 1931.
  Henry Lee McFee.  By Arthur Millier.  Scripps College, Claremont, Calif., 1950.

External links
Ask ART: Henry Lee McFee

1886 births
1953 deaths
19th-century American painters
19th-century American male artists
American male painters
20th-century American painters
Artists from St. Louis
Modern painters
20th-century American male artists